Karmaskalinsky District (Qırmıśqalı rayonı) is an administrative and municipal district (raion), one of the fifty-four in the Republic of Bashkortostan, Russia. It is located in the center of the republic and borders with Ufimsky and Iglinsky Districts in the north, Arkhangelsky District in the east, Gafuriysky District in the southeast, Aurgazinsky District in the south, Alsheyevsky District in the southwest, and with Chishminsky District in the west. Its administrative center is the rural locality (a selo) of Karmaskaly. As of the 2010 Census, the total population of the district was 51,504, with the population of Karmaskaly accounting for 16.6% of that number.

History
The district was established on August 20, 1930.

Administrative and municipal status
Within the framework of administrative divisions, Karmaskalinsky District is one of the fifty-four in the Republic of Bashkortostan. The district is divided into 16 selsoviets, comprising 122 rural localities. As a municipal division, the district is incorporated as Karmaskalinsky Municipal District. Its sixteen selsoviets are incorporated as sixteen rural settlements within the municipal district. The selo of Karmaskaly serves as the administrative center of both the administrative and municipal district.

References

Notes

Sources

Districts of Bashkortostan
States and territories established in 1930